Muradnagar is a city and a municipal board in Ghaziabad district, Uttar Pradesh, India.

Geography

Demographics
 India census, Muradnagar had a population of 100,080. Males constitute 53% of the population and females 47%. Muradnagar has an average literacy rate of 70%, greater than the national average of 60.5%: male literacy is 71%, and female literacy is 55%. In Muradnagar, 15% of the population is under 6 years of age.

References

Cities and towns in Ghaziabad district, India